"9AM in Dallas" is a song by rapper Drake from his debut album Thank Me Later. It was released as a promotional track for the album on June 12, 2010, with its eventual release onto the iTunes Store on June 15. The song features the rapper making a freestyle, and due to strong sales it charted at number 57 in the Billboard Hot 100. Recorded in the days leading up to the release of the album, it was not included in the track list for the US version of the album but is present on the UK iTunes version as a bonus track.

Charts

References

2010 singles
2010 songs
Drake (musician) songs
Song recordings produced by Boi-1da
Songs written by Drake (musician)
Songs written by Boi-1da
Songs written by Matthew Burnett
Cash Money Records singles